Áed Ua Ruairc, also known as Áed mac Art Uallach Ua Ruairc, was the King of Connacht from 1067 to 1087. He became king after killing the previous King of Connacht, Áed in Gai Bernaig, in battle in 1067.

References

 Leabhar na nGenealach, Dublin, 2004–2005
 Annals of the Four Masters, ed. John O'Donovan, Dublin, 1856
 Annals of Lough Ce, ed. W.M. Hennessey, London, 1871.
 Irish Kings and High Kings, Francis John Byrne, 3rd revised edition, Dublin: Four Courts Press, 2001. 
 "Ua Ruairc", in Seán Duffy (ed.), Medieval Ireland: An Encyclopedia. Routledge. 2005. pp.

1087 deaths
Kings of Connacht
People from County Cavan
People from County Leitrim
11th-century Irish monarchs
Year of birth unknown